Highway 928 is a provincial highway in the north-east region of the Canadian province of Saskatchewan. It runs from Highway 120 to Harding Road near the Narrow Hills Provincial Park. Highway 928 is about 10 km (6 mi) long.

See also 
Roads in Saskatchewan
Transportation in Saskatchewan

References 

928